Board President's XI or Board XI may refer to several cricket teams:

 Board President's XI (India), a team representing the Board of Control for Cricket in India
 Board President's XI, a team representing Cricket South Africa
 Board President's XI, a team representing Sri Lanka Cricket